Damian Jaroń (born 9 April 1990) is a Polish footballer who plays as a midfielder for Pogoń Grodzisk Mazowiecki.

Career

Club
In July 2010, he was loaned to GKP Gorzów Wlkp. on a one-year deal. He was released half a year later.

In March 2011, he was loaned to Wisła Płock on a half-year deal. In June 2011, he was sold to Wisła and signed a two and a half year contract.

International
He was a part of Poland under-21 national football team.

References

External links
 

1990 births
Living people
Polish footballers
Polonia Warsaw players
Stilon Gorzów Wielkopolski players
Wisła Płock players
Ząbkovia Ząbki players
Polonia Bytom players
Motor Lublin players
Ekstraklasa players
I liga players
II liga players
III liga players
Footballers from Warsaw
Association football midfielders